Mauritz Frumerie (18 May 1775 – 7 March 1853) was a Swedish medal engraver and lithographer.

Biography
Frumerie was born on 18 May 1775 in Karlskrona. He was the son of the inspector at the Admiralty College Klas Elias Frumerie and Margareta Sofia Stierngranat. Mauritz Frumerie was a grandson of Johan Frumerie (died 1756), secretary of the Admiralty in Karlskrona. From 1804 he was married to Katarina Magni.

Frumerie was a student and assistant to Carl Enhörning and from 1791 took part in the teaching at the Royal Swedish Academy of Fine Arts in Stockholm. He worked independently from 1806 and in 1808 was hired by the Academy of Sciences, being appointed as an agré at the Academy of Fine Arts the same year. As part of his work for the Academy of Sciences he made medals of its members until 1846 when he stopped this activity.  

Among Frumerie's works are medals on the coronation of Charles XIII (1809), the jubelfesten in 1818, the jubilee parties of the Academy of Fine Arts and the Academy of Sciences in 1839, and of Fredrik Henrik af Chapman. Frumerie also worked as a portrait lithographer. Frumerie is represented at, among others, Uppsala University Library.

Gallery

References

1775 births
1853 deaths
Swedish engravers
Swedish lithographers
People from Karlskrona
Swedish people of Walloon descent
Mauritz